Azygophleps melanophele is a moth in the family Cossidae. It is found in central Africa, including Nigeria.

References

Moths described in 1910
Azygophleps